Rogers Island may refer to:

Rogers Island (Connecticut)
Rogers Island (New York)
Rogers Island (Nunavut)